Papsaare is a village in Audru Parish, Pärnu County, in southwestern Estonia. It is located just northwest of the city of Pärnu and east of Audru, the administrative centre of the municipality. The centre of Pärnu is 5 km away. Papsaare has a population of 889 (as of 1 January 2011).

Motor racing circuit Audru Ring is located on the Pärnu side of the village, beside the Sauga River.

References

Villages in Pärnu County